Iwaoa is a genus of sea snails, marine gastropod mollusks in the family Horaiclavidae.

Species
Species within the genus Iwaoa include:
 Iwaoa invenusta Kantor, Fedosov & Puillandre, 2018
 Iwaoa reticulata Kuroda, 1953

References

 Bouchet P. & Rocroi J.-P. (2010). Nomenclator of Molluscan Supraspecific Names.
New and unusual deep-water Conoidea revised with shell, radula and DNA characters. Ruthenica 28(2): 47-82

External links

 Bouchet, P.; Kantor, Y. I.; Sysoev, A.; Puillandre, N. (2011). A new operational classification of the Conoidea (Gastropoda). Journal of Molluscan Studies. 77(3): 273-308.

 
Horaiclavidae